Hydrothermal explosions occur when superheated water trapped below the surface of the earth rapidly converts from liquid to steam, violently disrupting the confining rock. Boiling water, steam, mud, and rock fragments are ejected over an area of a few meters up to several kilometers in diameter. Although the energy originally comes from a deep igneous source, this energy is transferred to the surface by circulating meteoric water or mixtures of meteoric and magmatic water rather than by magma, as occurs in volcanic eruptions. The energy is stored as heat in hot water and rock within a few hundred feet of the surface.

Hydrothermal explosions are caused by the same instability and chain reaction mechanism as geysers but are so violent that rocks and mud are expelled along with water and steam.

Cause
Hydrothermal explosions occur where shallow interconnected reservoirs of water at temperatures as high as 250° Celsius underlie thermal fields. Water usually boils at 100 °C, but under pressure its boiling point increases, causing the water to become superheated. A sudden reduction in pressure causes a rapid phase transition from liquid to steam, resulting in an explosion of water and rock debris. During the last Ice Age, many hydrothermal explosions were triggered by the release of pressure as glaciers receded. Other causes are seismic activity, erosion, or hydraulic fracturing.

Yellowstone 
Yellowstone National Park is a thermally active area with an extensive system of hot springs, fumaroles, geysers, and mudpots. There are also several hydrothermal explosion craters, which are not to be confused with calderas, which are collapse features. Eight of these hydrothermal explosion craters are in hydrothermally cemented glacial deposits, and two are in Pleistocene ash-flow tuff.  Each is surrounded by a rim composed of debris derived from the crater, 30 to 100 feet high.

More than 20 large hydrothermal explosions have occurred at Yellowstone, approximately one every 700 years. The temperature of the magma reservoir below Yellowstone is believed to exceed 800° Celsius causing the heating of rocks in the region. If so, the average heat flow supplied by convection currents is 30 times greater than anywhere in the Rocky Mountains. Snowmelt and rainfall seep into the ground at a rapid rate and can conduct enough heat to raise the temperature of ground water to almost boiling.

The phenomena of geyser basins are the product of hot ground water rising close to the surface and occasionally bubbling through. Water temperatures of 238° Celsius at 332 meters have been recorded at Norris Geyser Basin. Pocket Basin was originally an ice-dammed lake over a hydrothermal system. Melting ice during the last glacial period caused the lake to rapidly drain, causing a sudden change in pressure triggering a massive hydrothermal explosion.

Geysers 
A hydrothermal explosion is similar to a geyser's eruption except that it includes surrounding rock and mud and does not occur periodically.

One well-known hydrothermal geyser is Old Faithful which throws up plumes of steam and water approximately every hour and a half on average. Rarely has any steam explosion violently hurled water and rock thousands of feet above the ground; however in Yellowstone’s geological history these colossal events have been recorded numerous times and have been found to have created new hills and shaped parts of the landscape.

The largest hydrothermal explosion ever documented was located near the northern edge of Yellowstone Lake, on an embankment commonly known as “Mary Bay”. Now consisting of a 1.5 mile crater, it was formed relatively recently, approximately 13,800 years ago. It is believed this crater was formed by a sequence of several hydrothermal explosions in a short time. What triggered this series of events has not yet been clearly established, but volcanologists believe a large earthquake could have played a role by accelerating the melting of nearby glaciers and thus depressurizing the hydrothermal system. Alternatively, rapid changes in the level of Yellowstone Lake may have been responsible.

Recent explosions 
Most of Yellowstone's recent large hydrothermal explosions have been the consequence of sudden changes of pressure deep within the hydrothermal system. Generally, these larger explosions have created craters in a north-south pattern (between Norris and Mammoth Hot Springs). It is estimated that all of the known hydrothermal craters were created between 14,000 and 3,000 years ago. Volcanologists believe no magma has ever broken through the fragile crust of Yellowstone Park or stirred the movement of magma in the reservoir beneath Yellowstone.

See also

References

External links
 A photo of a Hydrothermal explosion

Geothermal energy